Sigfús Sigurðsson (born 7 May 1975) is a retired Icelandic handball player. He competed at the 2004 and 2008 Summer Olympics, winning the silver medal in 2008. His grandfather, also Sigfús Sigurðsson, competed in the shot put at the 1948 Olympics.

Personal life
His nickname is  "The Russian Jeep" in Iceland.
He was engaged to Brazilian belly dancer Josy Zareen and they had a baby girl named Eyvör, born in April 2013. They broke up later that year.

Controversy
In November 2013 he admitted to having sold his Olympic silver medal won in 2008. Icelandic Handball Association intervened and became the custodian of the medal. His past problems with alcohol and drugs resulted in his bankruptcy; he has been clean for some years and is actively helping others attending AA meetings.

References

1975 births
Living people
Sigfús Sigurdsson 
Sigfús Sigurdsson 
Handball players at the 2004 Summer Olympics
Handball players at the 2008 Summer Olympics
Sigfús Sigurdsson 
Sigfús Sigurdsson 
Recipients of the Order of the Falcon
Olympic medalists in handball
Medalists at the 2008 Summer Olympics
Liga ASOBAL players
CB Ademar León players
Sigfús Sigurdsson